The Wyoming Department of Education (WDE) is the state education agency of Wyoming. It was headquartered on the second floor of the Hathaway Building in Cheyenne.   In Spring 2018, WDE moved to the 2nd Floor of the Herschler Building. The agency has offices in Laramie and Riverton. 

The Department is under the leadership of the Superintendent of Public Instruction Megan Degenfelder as of January 2023. 

The department manages the Wyoming Community College Commission, a network of public community colleges.

References

External links
 Wyoming Department of Education
 [https://www.facebook.com/pages/Wyoming-Department-of-Education/212625228865631 Wyoming Department of Education on Facebook

Public education in Wyoming
State departments of education of the United States
State agencies of Wyoming